The 2018 Fuzion 100 Ilkley Trophy was a professional tennis tournament played on outdoor grass courts. It was the fourth edition of the tournament and was part of the 2018 ATP Challenger Tour and the 2018 ITF Women's Circuit. It took place in Ilkley, United Kingdom, on 18–24 June 2018.

Men's singles main draw entrants

Seeds 

 1 Rankings as of 11 June 2018.

Other entrants 
The following players received wildcards into the singles main draw:
  Jack Draper
  George Loffhagen
  Aiden McHugh
  Alexander Ward

The following player received entry into the singles main draw as a special exempt:
  Ilya Ivashka

The following player received entry into the singles main draw as an alternate:
  Jürgen Zopp

The following players received entry from the qualifying draw:
  Kamil Majchrzak
  Hiroki Moriya
  Noah Rubin
  Akira Santillan

Women's singles main draw entrants

Seeds 

 1 Rankings as of 11 June 2018.

Other entrants 
The following players received a wildcard into the singles main draw:
  Harriet Dart
  Maia Lumsden
  Katie Swan
  Gabriella Taylor

The following players received entry from the qualifying draw:
  Bianca Andreescu
  Maria Sanchez
  Tereza Smitková
  Abigail Tere-Apisah

The following player received entry as a Lucky Loser:
  Naiktha Bains

Champions

Men's singles

 Sergiy Stakhovsky def.  Oscar Otte 6–4, 6–4.

Women's singles

 Tereza Smitková def.  Dayana Yastremska, 7–6(7–2), 3–6, 7–6(7–4)

Men's doubles

 Austin Krajicek /  Jeevan Nedunchezhiyan def.  Kevin Krawietz /  Andreas Mies 6–3, 6–3.

Women's doubles

 Asia Muhammad /  Maria Sanchez def.  Natela Dzalamidze /  Galina Voskoboeva, 4–6, 6–3, [10–1]

External links 
 2018 Fuzion 100 Ilkley Trophy at ITFtennis.com
 Official website

Fuzion 100 Ilkley Trophy
2018 ITF Women's Circuit
2018
2018 in English tennis
June 2018 sports events in the United Kingdom